John Wayne Cox Jr. (born July 10, 1947) is an American politician and attorney who served a single term as a Democratic member of the United States House of Representatives representing Illinois's 16th congressional district.

Early life and career
Cox was born in Hazel Green, Wisconsin. He attended the nearby University of Wisconsin–Platteville in Platteville, Wisconsin. After graduation, he joined the United States Army where he served from 1969-1970. He then earned his J.D. degree at John Marshall Law School in Chicago. In 1976, Cox defeated Victor Sprengelmeyer, a Republican appointee, for election to serve as State's Attorney for Jo Daviess County, Illinois. During his tenure as State's Attorney, Cox was an advocate for enhanced federal prosecution of human traffickers operating on the Illinois—Iowa border. He served two terms and returned to private practice. He was succeeded by J. Christopher Moore as State's Attorney.

After his terms as State's Attorney, Cox served as a Special Assistant Attorney General with the Illinois Department of Public Aid, an instructor at Loras College, and the City Attorney for Galena, Illinois.

Congressional term
After the retirement of Republican incumbent Lynn Morley Martin, Cox joined the race to succeed her in Congress. Surprisingly, Cox defeated Republican John Hallock, a member of the Illinois House of Representatives from Rockford. During his term, he served on the Banking, Finance and Urban Affairs Committee; Government Operations Committee; Financial Institutions Supervision, Regulation and Insurance Subcommittee; Housing and Community Development Subcommittee; and Government Information, Justice and Agriculture Subcommittee

During the Republican-led 1991 decennial redistricting, the 16th district added portions of staunchly Republican McHenry County. Donald Manzullo defeated Cox in the newly drawn 16th district. At the time of Cox's loss, fellow Illinois Democrat Dan Rostenkowski was laying the groundwork to get Cox a seat on the United States House Committee on Ways and Means. Manzullo held the seat until his defeat by fellow Republican Congressman Adam Kinzinger for renomination in the 2012 Republican primary election held on March 20, 2012, after the 2011 decennial redistricting.

Post congressional career
Following his term, Cox returned to Galena, Illinois where he continued his private law practice. Since returning to Galena, Cox he served as City Attorney for the City of Galena, Illinois. Cox served as Vice President for External Affairs and General Counsel for Jo-Carroll Energy, Inc. (NFP), an Illinois energy cooperative until he retired.

Notes

External links

 

1947 births
Illinois lawyers
Living people
People from Galena, Illinois
People from Hazel Green, Wisconsin
University of Wisconsin–Platteville alumni
Military personnel from Wisconsin
Democratic Party members of the United States House of Representatives from Illinois
Businesspeople from Illinois
John Marshall Law School (Chicago) alumni
Loras College faculty